Winston Churchill (1874–1965) was a British statesman who led the United Kingdom and British Empire during the Second World War.

Churchill may also refer to:

Film and television
 The Churchills (TV series), a Channel 4 documentary written and presented by David Starkey
 Churchill (film), 2017 biographical film

Military
 Churchill tank, a British Second World War tank
 HMS Churchill (I45), a Second World War destroyer
 HMS Churchill (S46), a nuclear submarine
 Churchill-class submarine
 CFS Churchill, a Canadian Forces base in Churchill, Manitoba, Canada
 , a destroyer of the United States Navy

Music
 Churchill (band), an alternative band from Denver, US
 The Churchills (Israeli band)
 The Churchills (American band)

Organisations
 Churchill Insurance, an insurance company based in the UK
 The Churchill Machine Tool Company, British machine tools manufacturer and importer

People
 Churchill (surname)
 Churchill (family)
 Churchill Babington (1821–1889), English classical scholar, archaeologist and naturalist
 Churchill, stage name of Daniel Ndambuki (born 1977), Kenyan comedian

Places

Multiple locations
 Churchill County (disambiguation)
 Churchill Falls (disambiguation)
 Church Hill (disambiguation)
 Churchill Island (disambiguation)
 Churchill Lake (disambiguation)
 Churchill Park (disambiguation)
 Churchill River (disambiguation)
 Churchill Square (disambiguation), various city squares

Antarctica
 Churchill Mountains, Antarctica

Australia
 Churchill, Queensland, a suburb of Ipswich
 Churchill, Victoria, a town

Canada
 Churchill, Manitoba, a town
 Churchill (provincial electoral district)
 Churchill, former name of Churchill—Keewatinook Aski federal electoral district, Manitoba
 Churchill, Prince Edward Island, a community
 Churchill, Simcoe County, Ontario, a community of the town of Innisfil
 Churchill, Wellington County, Ontario, a community of the town of Erin

Ireland
 Churchill, County Donegal, a village in Ireland

United Kingdom
 Churchill, East Devon, a hamlet in All Saints parish
 Churchill, Devon, a hamlet near East Down
 Churchill, Oxfordshire, a village and civil parish
 Churchill, Somerset, a village and civil parish
 Churchill, Wychavon, Worcestershire, near Worcester, sometimes called Churchill in Oswaldslow
 Churchill, Wyre Forest, a village near Kidderminster sometimes called Churchill in Halfshire

United States
 Churchill, Holyoke, Massachusetts, a neighborhood in Holyoke
 Churchill, Chippewa County, Minnesota, an unincorporated community
 Churchill, Renville County, Minnesota, an unincorporated community
 Churchill, Montana
 Churchill, Ohio, a census-designated place
 Churchill, Pennsylvania, a borough
 Churchill Township, Michigan
 Mount Churchill, Alaska, a volcano

Schools
 Churchill Academy and Sixth Form, North Somerset, England
 Churchill College, Cambridge, a constituent college of the University of Cambridge, England
 Churchill Public School (disambiguation)
 Churchill School, in Baker City, Oregon
 Churchill School (Harare), Zimbabwe
 Winston Churchill High School (disambiguation)

Transportation
 TCDD 45151 Class or Churchills, a class of steam locomotives
 Churchill railway station,  Churchill, County Donegal, Ireland
 Churchill station (Edmonton), Alberta, Canada
 Churchill station (Manitoba), Canada

Other uses
 Churchill (cocktail)
 Churchill (horse) (born 2014), an Irish-bred racehorse
 Churchill (snow cone), a dessert from Costa Rica
 Churchill, a species of electric fish in the genus Petrocephalus
 Churchill, a type of parejo cigar
 Churchill, the polar bear depicted on the Canadian toonie

See also
 Churchill Bust (disambiguation)
 Churchill Downs (disambiguation)
 Churchill Museum (disambiguation)
 Winston Churchill (disambiguation)
 Cherchell, a seaport in Algeria